Santa Cruz del Sur Municipal Museum is a museum located in Santa Cruz del Sur, Cuba. It was established on 30 December 1982.

The museum holds collections on history, weaponry, decorative arts and archeology.

See also 
 List of museums in Cuba

References 

Museums in Cuba
Buildings and structures in Camagüey Province
Museums established in 1982
1982 establishments in Cuba
20th-century architecture in Cuba